Boullogne is a French surname. Notable people with the surname include:

Bon Boullogne (died 1717), French painter
Geneviève Boullogne (1645–1708), French painter
Louis Boullogne (c. 1609 – 1674), French painter
Louis de Boullogne (1654–1733), French painter
Madeleine Boullogne (1646–1710), French painter

See also
Boulogne (disambiguation)

French-language surnames